Ewa Gentry  is a housing development and, as Ewa Gentry, a census-designated place (CDP) located in the Ewa District and the City & County of Honolulu on the leeward side of Oahu in Hawaii about  from Honolulu. As of the 2010 Census, the CDP had a total population of 22,690.

This area also known just as Ewa (in Hawaiian, ewa means "crooked"). In the late 19th century to early 20th century, Ewa was one of the large population centers on the Island of Oahu, with industry focused around sugar cane production. The Ewa Mill, in Ewa was a major employer that set up residential villages. Sugar cane is no longer grown on the Ewa Plain and Ewa Gentry is now part of Oahu's new suburban growth center—an area of substantial sprawl spreading unbroken to the south to Ewa Gentry, north to Honouliuli, and west to Kalaeloa and Kapolei. This area is now referred to as Oahu's Second City, with a city center (downtown) located in Kapolei.

Geography 
Ewa Gentry is located at 21°20'22" North, 158°1'47" West (21.339441, -158.029725), inland from Ewa Gentry on the west side of the main thoroughfare, Fort Weaver Road (State Rte. 76). This highway runs north past Ewa to Waipahu, connecting there to Farrington Highway (State Rte. 90) and the H-1 freeway. Major cross streets are Kapolei Parkway, which will eventually connect to Kapolei City Center and Geiger Road, which runs westward to Kalaeloa.

Demographics 

As of the census of 2000, there were 4,939 people, 1,734 households, and 1,239 families residing in the CDP. The racial makeup of the CDP was 15.19% White, 3.87% African American, 0.18% Native American, 51.35% Asian, 5.12% Pacific Islander, 1.03% from other races, and 23.26% from two or more races. 8.69% of the population are Hispanic or Latino of any race.

There were 1,734 households, out of which 44.4% had children under the age of 18 living with them, 59.6% were married couples living together, 7.5% had a female householder with no husband present, and 28.5% were non-families. 20.8% of all households were made up of individuals, and 1.2% had someone living alone who was 65 years of age or older. The average household size was 2.85 and the average family size was 3.39.

In this CDP the population was spread out, with 28.6% under the age of 18, 7.9% from 18 to 24, 45.2% from 25 to 44, 14.1% from 45 to 64, and 4.2% who were 65 years of age or older. The median age was 32 years. For every 100 females there were 104.3 males. For every 100 females age 18 and over, there were 104.8 males.

The median income for a household in the CDP was $61,462, and the median income for a family was $70,633. Males had a median income of $39,354 versus $30,152 for females. The per capita income for the CDP was $21,833. 2.6% of the population and 1.4% of families were below the poverty line. Out of the total population, 0.9% of those under the age of 18 and 0.0% of those 65 and older were living below the poverty line.

References 

Census-designated places in Honolulu County, Hawaii